Andrea Fatona (born in Birmingham, England, of Nigerian and Jamaican heritage) is a Canadian independent curator and scholar. She is an associate professor at OCAD University, where her areas of expertise includes black, contemporary art and curatorial studies.

Early life 
In 2011, Fatona received her PhD from the University of Toronto (OISE). Titled "Where Outreach Meets Outrage: Racial Equity policy formation at the Canada Council for the Arts (1989-1999)", her dissertation examined policy and practice with regards to racial equity at the Canada Council for the Arts. Fatona was a member of the Canada Council Equity advisory committee for the Visual Arts section between 2003 and 2005.

Career 
Fatona held curatorial positions at Artspeak in Vancouver, the Art Gallery of Ottawa, Artspace Peterborough, and Video In (Vancouver).

She curated a show of the work of Winsom, Belize-based Canadian and Maroon artist, at the AGO. 

Her research contributed to the Hogan's Alley, Vancouver memorial project, which memorializes Black cultural history in Vancouver. CBC Arts placed Fatona at the forefront of the Black cultural movement in Canada.

In 2015, Fatona took the helm of the SSHRC-funded State of Blackness: From Production to Presentation Conference, an ongoing research project geared towards developing art education practices as a way of rectifying the invisibility of Blackness in Canadian art curriculum.

In 2020, Fatona obtains a Tier 2 Canada Research Chair in Canadian Black Diasporic Cultural Production, which aims to make visible and provide access to the works of contemporary Black artists, craftspeople, curators, and critics in Canada. Led by Andrea Fatona, on March 18, 2021, OCAD University inaugurates its Center for the Study of the Black Canadian Diaspora.

Curated exhibitions 
Co-curator, Land Marks (touring exhibition Chatham, Windsor, Peterborough). The Thames Art Gallery, Chatham, Ont. (originating gallery), 2013 -2015.

Curator, Edna Paterson-Petty: African-American Quilts. The Ottawa Art Gallery, Ottawa, ON, 2011.

Co-curator, Alex Wyse- Wyse Works: Exposing the Inevitable. The Ottawa Art Gallery, Ottawa, ON, 2011. 

Initiator and coordinator of Will Work for Food, a community arts project involving Sandy Hill Community Health Centre and Operation Come Home as primary community partners. The Ottawa Art Gallery, Ottawa, ON, 2010. 

Curator, Avaaz. Sound installation by Dipna Horra. The Ottawa Art Gallery, Ottawa, ON, 2010.

Curator, Intersections. Paintings by artist-programmer Eric Sze-Lang. The Ottawa Art Gallery, Ottawa, ON, 2010.

Curator, Duncan de Kergommeaux: These Are the Marks I Make "a survey exhibition of painter Duncan de Kergommeaux that spans 50 years of the artist's life. The Ottawa Art Gallery, Ottawa, Ont., Museum London, 2010.

Curator, Fibred Optics, group exhibition that explores the multi-sensorial nature of visual narration and perception. Frances Dorsey, Jerome Havre, Ed Pien and Michele Provost. The Ottawa Art Gallery, Ottawa, ON, 2009 and Richmond Art Gallery, Richmond, B.C. in 2011.

Curator in collaboration with Deanna Bowen, Reading the Image: Poetics of the Black Diaspora, group, national touring exhibition "Deanna Bowen, Maud Sulter, Christopher Cozier and Michael Fernandes - that explores issues pertaining to diasporic movement and the relationship of African peoples to the project of modernity. Thames Art Gallery, Chatham, Ont. (originating gallery); Robert McLaughlin Gallery, Oshawa, Ontario; Mount Saint Vincent University Art Gallery, Halifax, Nova Scotia; Yukon Art Centre, Whitehorse, Yukon Territory, 2006.

Curator, The Attack of the Sandwich Man, solo exhibition by Chris Cozier (Trinidad), video collaboration with Richard Fung; addresses issues related to nation- making, culture, the politics of gender and the post- colonial Caribbean. A Space Gallery, Toronto, ON, 2001.

Awards and grants 
Connections Conference Grant, Social Science and Humanities Research Council of Canada Culturally Diverse Curator Award, Ontario Arts Council, 2013

Research Seed Grant, OCADU 2007 Travel Grant, Canada Council for the Arts, Equity Office, 2012

School of Graduate Studies Research Travel Grant, University of Toronto, 2006

OISE/University of Toronto Academic Excellence Award, 2005-2007

Social Science and Humanities Research Council of Canada (SSHRC) Doctoral Fellowship, 2005-2007

OISE/University of Toronto Academic Excellence Award, 2005-2006

OISE/University of Toronto Graduate Fellowship Award, 2003-2005

Off-the-Radar Grant, Inter-Arts, Canada Council for the Arts, 2003

OISE/University of Toronto Graduate Fellowship Award, 2002

Curator Travel Grant, Canada Council New Media Section, 2002

Bibliography 

 2018 Book chapter, "Claiming Space: The Development of Black Canadian Cultural Activism of the 1980s and 1990s" Ed. Nelson, Charmaine A. Towards an African Canadian Art History  Art, Memory, Resistance. Concord, Ont.: Captus Press Inc., 2018.
 2015  Catalogue essay, Objects, Histories, and Memory, in conjunction with the exhibition, “Mining Memory: Sylvia D. Hamilton”, Thames Art Gallery, Chatham, ON
 2013  Book chapter, "Arts funding, the State, and Canadian Nation-making" in Critical Canadian Studies, eds, Lynn Caldwell, Darryl Leroux, Carianne Leung. NS: Fernwood Press
 2011 Interview with Duncan de Kergommeaux in catalogue These Are the Marks I make: Duncan de Kergommeaux, The Ottawa Art Gallery and Museum London co- publication
 2010  Catalogue essay, Network Installations: Marie-Josée Laframboise, Musée d'art de Joliette, The Ottawa Art Gallery and Southern Alberta Art Gallery co-publication
 2009  Catalogue essay, Fibred Optics exhibition, The Ottawa Art Gallery, Ottawa, ON
 2007  "Bring It Back: Thinking the Ethno-Politics of Identity Again" with Aruna Srivastava and Rinaldo Walcott, FUSE Magazine, Vol.30, #4 2006 Catalogue essay, Reading the Image: Poetics of the Black Diaspora, Thames Art Gallery, Chatham, ON.
 2006  "In the Presence of Absence: Invisibility, Black Canadian History, and Melinda Mollineaux's Pinhole Photography", Canadian Journal of Communication, Vol. 31, 227-238
 2005  "Social Justice Education through a School-Community Partnership in Media Arts–, Orbit: OISE/UT's Magazine for Schools, Vol. 35, No. 2 2005 –In the Presence of Absence: My response to re- presentations of an Emancipation Day picnic–, Small Axe: Journal of Caribbean Criticism (on-line edition)
 2002 Contributor, 13 Conversations about art and cultural race politics, eds. Monika Kin Gagnon and Richard Fung. Artexte Editions, Montreal.

References

Living people
Year of birth missing (living people)
Academic staff of OCAD University
Canadian curators
Canadian women curators